Cortinarius is a globally distributed genus of mushrooms in the family Cortinariaceae. It is suspected to be the largest genus of agarics, containing over 2,000 widespread species. A common feature among all species in the genus Cortinarius is that young specimens have a cortina (veil) between the cap and the stem, hence the name, meaning curtained. Most of the fibres of the cortina are ephemeral and will leave no trace once gone, except for limited remnants on the stem or cap edge in some species. All have a rusty brown spore print. The common names cortinar and webcap refer to members of the genus. Due to dangerous toxicity of several species (such as Cortinarius orellanus) and the fact that it is difficult to distinguish between various species of the genus, non-expert consumption of mushrooms from the genus is discouraged.

Distinguishing features
The veil protects the gills in younger specimens and usually disappears leaving little to no trace of itself as the mushroom grows. The spores of a Cortinarius mushroom are rust brown to brownish red in color. It is usually possible to identify a mushroom as being a member of the genus, but extremely difficult to positively identify the species as many of the species are nearly identical. All mushrooms in this genus form mycorrhizae.

Many mushrooms in the genus, for example Cortinarius sanguineus and other species in section Dermocybe, are colourful and are often used for dyeing.

Toxicity
Several mushrooms in the genus Cortinarius are poisonous, mainly because they cause acute tubulointerstitial nephritis. Some are even lethal, such as Cortinarius rubellus and Cortinarius orellanus. Therefore, a common rule when it comes to mushrooms from this genus is that none of them should be eaten. Many Cortinarius varieties can be mistaken for other edible mushrooms (such as the Blewit Mushroom) and should therefore be researched extensively before you consider ingesting a look alike of this genus.  However, some species—notably the giant of the genus, Cortinarius praestans and the gypsy mushroom (Cortinarius caperatus)—are edible and appreciated in several European countries.

The toxin in Cortinarius species, orellanine is easy to detect because it is fluorescent.  It has been found in at least 34 Cortinariaceae.

Classification
Molecular studies of members of the genus Rozites, including its most famous member R. caperata, have shown them nested within Cortinarius and have been sunk into this genus. This genus was erected on the basis of a double veil, yet its members do not form a discrete lineage and lie nested within Cortinarius. Hence the genus is no longer recognised.

Some consider the subgenus Dermocybe to have generic status. It does form a single lineage, but lies within Cortinarius so the consensus has been to sink it into the larger genus.

Selected species

Cortinarius austrovenetus - also known as Dermocybe austroveneta or green skin-head is an Australian fungus typical of the brightly coloured Dermocybe subgenus.
Cortinarius caperatus, the "gypsy mushroom", is an edible mushroom found in northern regions of Europe and North America.
Cortinarius orellanus and C. rubellus are two of the deadly webcaps found in Europe and North America.

References

 
Agaricales genera